David E. Olson is an American chemist and neuroscientist. He is an associate professor of chemistry, biochemistry and molecular medicine at the University of California, Davis.

Olson is best known for his work investigating neuroplasticity promoting compounds, especially the potential of psychedelic drugs, including ketamine and serotonergic psychedelics, to alter brain structure and function. Olson also coined a term to refer to small molecules that are fast acting, durable neuroplasticity promoting compounds: psychoplastogens. Psychoplastogens are being developed to treat a wide variety of neuropsychiatric and neurodegenerative diseases, including depression, PTSD, and substance use disorders, among many others.

Early life 
Olson received his B.S. from Union College in 2006 with a major in chemistry and a minor in biology.  

He then worked briefly at Albany Molecular Research Inc. before completing a Ph.D. in chemistry at Stanford University in 2011, where he worked in the laboratory of Justin Du Bois, developing a variety of methods for synthesizing nitrogen-containing compounds.

Olson undertook postdoctoral research in neuroscience at the Stanley Center for Psychiatric Research at the Broad Institute of MIT and Harvard where he focused on the therapeutic potential of HDAC inhibitors.

Career 
In 2015 Olson started his independent career at the University of California, Davis with a joint appointment in the Department of Chemistry (College of Letters and Science) and the Department of Biochemistry and Molecular Medicine (School of Medicine). He is also an affiliate member of the Center for Neuroscience and the UC Davis Memory and Plasticity Program. In 2021, Olson was promoted to associate professor with tenure. In 2019, Olson co-founded Delix Therapeutics—a biotech company focused on developing novel neuroplasticity-promoting therapeutics for central nervous system diseases (CNS). Olson served as the company's Chief Scientific Officer until 2021, when he transitioned to the roles of Chief Innovation Officer and Head of the Scientific Advisory Board.

Other activities 
Currently, he serves on the editorial advisory boards of the journals ACS Chemical Neuroscience and ACS Pharmacology & Translational Science.

Published works 
Olson has published numerous scientific publications. Several of his key contributions to the field are cited below: 

 Dong, C.; Ly, C.; Dunlap, L. E.; Vargas, M. V.; Sun, J.; Hwang, I.-W.; Azinfar, A.; Oh, W. C.; Wetsel, W. C.; Olson, D. E.; Tian, L. Psychedelic-Inspired Drug Discovery Using an Engineered Biosensor. Cell, 2021, 184, 2779–2792.
 Cameron, L. P.; Tombari, R. J.; Lu, J.; Pell, A. J.; Hurley, Z. Q.; Ehinger, Y.; Vargas, M. V.; McCarroll, M. N.; Taylor, J. C.; Myers-Turnbull, D.; Liu, T.; Yaghoobi, B.; Laskowski, L. J.; Anderson, E. I.; Zhang, G.; Viswanathan, J.; Brown, B. M.; Tjia, M.; Dunlap, L. E.; Rabow, Z. T.; Fiehn, O.; Wulff, H.; McCorvy, J. D.; Lein, P. J.; Kokel, D.; Ron, D.; Peters, J.; Zuo, Y.; Olson, D. E. A Non-Hallucinogenic Psychedelic Analogue with Therapeutic Potential. Nature, 2021, 589, 474–479.
 Dunlap, L. E.; Azinfar, A.; Ly, C.; Cameron, L. P.; Viswanathan, J.; Tombari, R. J.; Myers-Turnbull, D.; Taylor, J. C.; Grodzki, A. C.; Lein, P. J.; Kokel, D.; Olson, D. E. Identification of Psychoplastogenic N,N-Dimethylaminoisotryptamine (isoDMT) Analogs Through Structure-Activity Relationship Studies. J. Med. Chem., 2020, 63, 1142–1155.
 Cameron, L. P.; Benson, C. J.; DeFelice, B. C.; Fiehn, O.; Olson, D. E. Chronic, Intermittent Microdoses of the Psychedelic N,N‐Dimethyltryptamine (DMT) Produce Positive Effects on Mood and Anxiety in Rodents. ACS Chem. Neurosci., 2019, 10, 3261−3270.
 Ly, C.; Greb, A. C.; Cameron, L. P.; Wong, J.; Barragan, E.; Wilson, P.; Burbach, K. F.; Dunlap, L. E.; Soltanzadeh Zarandi, S.; Sood, A.; Duim, W. C.; Paddy, M. R.; Dennis, M.; McAllister, A. K.; Ori-McKenney, K. M.; Gray, J. A.; Olson, D. E. Psychedelics Promote Structural and Functional Neural Plasticity. Cell Rep. 2018, 23, 3170–3182.

References 

Year of birth missing (living people)
Living people
American neuroscientists
American chemists
University of California, Davis faculty